W. japonica  may refer to:
 Wasabia japonica, the wasabi or Japanese horseradish, a plant species
 Weigela japonica, a flowering plant species in the genus Weigela
 Wisteriopsis japonica, a flowering plant species
 Woodwardia japonica, a fern species in the genus Woodwardia

See also
 Japonica (disambiguation)